Alessandro Famularo (born 11 February 2003) is a Venezuelan racing driver who currently competes in FIA Formula 3 for Charouz Racing System. He has previously raced in the Formula Regional European Championship for Van Amersfoort Racing and G4 Racing, and is an ADAC Formula 4 race winner.

He is coached by Colombian former Formula One and NASCAR driver Juan Pablo Montoya.

Personal life 
Famularo was born on 11 February 2003 in the Venezuelan capital of Caracas. His twin brother Anthony is also a racing driver who last raced in the 2019 U.S. F2000 National Championship. They were teammates at Bhaitech in the 2018 Italian F4 Championship.

Career

Karting 
Famularo started karting in his native Venezuela at the age of four years old. He was a factory driver for the Birel ART team in 2017 and 2018.

Formula 4 
Famularo began his racing career in 2018, racing for Bhaitech in the Italian F4 Championship. He was a lower-midfield runner for most of the season, his only points finishes coming in the last two rounds at Vallelunga and Mugello.

In 2019 he switched to reigning teams' champions Prema Powerteam for a double program in Italian F4 and ADAC Formula 4. The move yielded better results for Famularo straightaway, as he scored a podium in the Italian F4 season opener at Vallelunga. He then went on to win at the Zandvoort ADAC F4 round in August, after a tyre gamble to start a wet race on slicks. Those were only two only podiums of the year, but regular points finishes in both series meant he finished 12th in Italian F4 and 15th in ADAC F4, of which he sat out the last three rounds.

Formula Regional 
On 18 February 2020, it was announced that Famularo would make the step up to the Formula Regional European Championship with Van Amersfoort Racing. Having missed the opening two meetings through personal issues, he made his debut in the series at the Red Bull Ring in September. He left the championship after three rounds, in which he amassed 73 points and a best finish of fourth.

Famularo briefly returned to the series in 2021, as it merged with the Formula Renault Eurocup to form the Formula Regional European Championship by Alpine. He participated in three rounds for G4 Racing and scored no points.

FIA Formula 3

2020 
Famularo took part in FIA Formula 3 post-season testing at Barcelona and Jerez in October 2020, driving for Campos Racing.

2022 
Famularo made his FIA Formula 3 debut with Charouz Racing System during the 2022 Monza season finale, replacing David Schumacher as the German was required to attend his DTM commitments. On his FIA F3 debut, where he finished both races in 23rd, Famularo stated that "[we] made a big step". Famularo ended the standings second to last in 39th.

Famularo remained with Charouz for that year's post-season test at Jerez, driving for the team on all three days.

Racing record

Career summary

Complete Italian F4 Championship results
(key) (Races in bold indicate pole position) (Races in italics indicate fastest lap)

Complete ADAC Formula 4 Championship results 
(key) (Races in bold indicate pole position) (Races in italics indicate fastest lap)

Complete Formula Regional European Championship results 
(key) (Races in bold indicate pole position) (Races in italics indicate fastest lap)

Complete FIA Formula 3 Championship results 
(key) (Races in bold indicate pole position; races in italics indicate points for the fastest lap of top ten finishers)

References

External links 
 

2003 births
Living people
Venezuelan racing drivers
Italian F4 Championship drivers
ADAC Formula 4 drivers
Formula Regional European Championship drivers
Prema Powerteam drivers
Bhaitech drivers
Van Amersfoort Racing drivers
Karting World Championship drivers
FIA Formula 3 Championship drivers
Charouz Racing System drivers
Venezuelan twins